Sir Charles Christopher Griffith, KA, SCM (born 14 December 1938) is a West Indian former cricketer who played in 28 Tests from 1960 to 1969. He formed a formidable fast bowling partnership with Wes Hall during the 1960s, but experienced a number of controversies during his career, notably being called for throwing twice, and fracturing the skull of Indian cricket captain Nari Contractor with a bouncer.

When Griffith started playing club cricket in Barbados at a young age, he was as a right-arm spinner. During one game he decided to bowl right arm fast and finished with figures of 7 for 1. He remained a fast bowler and soon after was chosen to represent Barbados. His first-class debut was made against the Marylebone Cricket Club who were touring the Caribbean in 1959–60 and in the space of two overs he dismissed England internationals Colin Cowdrey, Mike Smith and Peter May.

In the match between Barbados and the touring Indians in 1961–62, captain Nari Contractor was hit on the back of the head by a Griffith bouncer, fracturing his skull, and leading to the premature end of his career. Later in the match Griffith was no-balled by umpire Cortez Jordan for throwing, the first of two times that he was called during his career.  The other occasion was a tour match against Lancashire in 1966, when Griffith was called by Arthur Fagg.

Griffith had a successful tour of England in 1963, finishing the summer with 119 wickets at 12.3, 32 of them coming in the Test series.  In the first innings of the Headingley Test he took 6 for 36 and finished the match with 9 wickets. He was a Wisden Cricketer of the Year in 1964.

Griffith was made a Knight of St Andrew by the Barbadian government in 2017, having previously been given the Silver Crown of Merit in 1992.

References

1938 births
Living people
Barbadian knights
West Indies Test cricketers
Barbadian cricketers
Barbados cricketers
Commonwealth XI cricketers
Cricket players and officials awarded knighthoods
International Cavaliers cricketers
Wisden Cricketers of the Year